In information theory, Gibbs' inequality is a statement about the information entropy of a discrete probability distribution. Several other bounds on the entropy of probability distributions are derived from Gibbs' inequality, including Fano's inequality.
It was first presented by J. Willard Gibbs in the 19th century.

Gibbs' inequality
Suppose that

is a discrete probability distribution. Then for any other probability distribution

the following inequality between positive quantities (since pi and qi are between zero and one) holds:

with equality if and only if

for all i. Put in words, the information entropy of a distribution P is less than or equal to its cross entropy with any other distribution Q.

The difference between the two quantities is the Kullback–Leibler divergence or relative entropy, so the inequality can also be written:

Note that the use of base-2 logarithms is optional, and 
allows one to refer to the quantity on each side of the inequality as an 
"average surprisal" measured in bits.

Proof
For simplicity, we prove the statement using the natural logarithm.  Because

the particular logarithm base  that we choose only scales the relationship by the factor .

Let  denote the set of all  for which pi is non-zero. Then, since  for all x > 0, with equality if and only if x=1, we have:

The last inequality is a consequence of the pi and qi being part of a probability distribution. Specifically, the sum of all non-zero values is 1. Some non-zero qi, however, may have been excluded since the choice of indices is conditioned upon the pi being non-zero. Therefore the sum of the qi may be less than 1.

So far, over the index set  , we have:

,

or equivalently
 
.

We arrive at 

For equality to hold, we require
  for all  so that the equality  holds, 

Alternative proofs
The result can alternatively be proved using Jensen's inequality, the log sum inequality, or the fact that the Kullback-Leibler divergence is a form of Bregman divergence. Below we give a proof based on Jensen's inequality:

Because log is a concave function, we have that:

Where the first inequality is due to Jensen's inequality, and the last equality is due to the same reason given in the above proof.

Furthermore, since  is strictly concave, by the equality condition of Jensen's inequality we get equality when

and

Where we use the fact that  are probability distributions. Therefore the equality happens when .

Corollary

The proof is trivial – simply set  for all i.

See also
 Information entropy
 Bregman divergence
 Log sum inequality

References

Information theory
Coding theory
Probabilistic inequalities
Articles containing proofs